Zdeněk Nenadál (born 12 February 1964) is a Czech athlete. He competed in the men's javelin throw at the 1988 Summer Olympics.

References

1964 births
Living people
Athletes (track and field) at the 1988 Summer Olympics
Czech male javelin throwers
Olympic athletes of Czechoslovakia
Sportspeople from Prostějov